Hardas Chak, also called Hardaschak, is a village situated in Saran district of Bihar state, India. The population was 899 at the 2011 Indian census.

References

Villages in Saran district